Hala Alyan (born July 27, 1986) is a Palestinian-American writer, poet, and clinical psychologist who specializes in trauma, addiction, and cross-cultural behavior. Her writing covers aspects of identity and the effects of displacement, particularly within the Palestinian diaspora. She is also known for acting in the short films I Say Dust andTallahassee (directed by Darine Hotait).

Biography 

Hala Alyan was born in Carbondale, Illinois, on July 27, 1986. Her family lived in Kuwait after her birth but sought political asylum in the United States when Iraqi forces invaded the country.

She received her doctorate in clinical psychology at Rutgers University and works part-time at New York University in the Counseling and Wellness Center. She and her husband live in Brooklyn, New York.

Awards and works
Alyan's poems have been published in journals and literary magazines.

In her novel Salt Houses, the Yacoub family, a Palestinian family, is forced to leave their home but after settling in Kuwait are forced to leave again during the invasion by Sadam Hussein.

Alyan's Atrium: Poems received an award from the Arab American National Museum in 2013. In 2018, she won the Dayton Literary Peace Prize, an award given to writers whose writing is believed to promote peace. She was a visiting fellow at the American Library in Paris in the fall of 2018.

The Twenty-Ninth Year, a collection of Alyan's poems was published by Mariner in January 2019.

Her second novel The Arsonists' City was published by Houghton Mifflin Harcourt on March 9, 2021 to critical acclaim. The novel is about the Nasr family, which reunites in Beirut to discuss the family patriarch's will, revealing family secrets and the impact of war and violence on the family.

Bibliography

Novels 
 Salt Houses (2017)
The Arsonists' City (2021)

Poetry 
Collections
 
 
 

List of poems

Essays and other works 

 "In Dust," essay appearing in Being Palestinian: Personal Reflections on Palestinian Identity in the Diaspora, edited by Yasir Suleiman (2016)

References

References:

 
Wael Salam. (2022) The Burden of the Past: Memories, Resistance and Existence in Susan Abulhawa's Mornings in Jenin and Hala Alyan's Salt Houses. Interventions 24:1, pages 31–48. https://doi.org/10.1080/1369801X.2020.1863840.

Wael Salam. (2022) The Palestinian Re-experience of Historical Violence: “A Wound Never Completely Scabbed Over”. English Studies 103:1, pages 94–112. https://doi.org/10.1080/0013838X.2021.1997469

Salam, Wael J., and Safi Mahfouz. “Claims of memory: Transgenerational traumas,: fluid identities, and resistance in Hala Alyan’s Salt Houses.” Journal of Postcolonial Writing 56, no. 3 (2020): 296–309. https://doi.org/10.1080/17449855.2020.1755718

External links
 
 

1986 births
Living people
21st-century American novelists
21st-century American women writers
American historical novelists
American people of Palestinian descent
21st-century American psychologists
American women novelists
American women psychologists
The Believer (magazine) people
The New Yorker people
People from Carbondale, Illinois
Rutgers University alumni
Writers from Brooklyn